This article contains information about the literary events and publications of 1994.

Events
October 11 – The choice of James Kelman's book How Late It Was, How Late as the year's Booker Prize winner proves controversial. One of the judges, Rabbi Julia Neuberger, declares it "a disgrace" and leaves the event, later calling the book "crap"; WHSmith's marketing manager calls the award "an embarrassment to the whole book trade"; Waterstone's in Glasgow (where it is set) sells a mere 13 copies of Kelman's "Mogadon" the following week.
November 26 – Poland's Ministry of Culture and Art orders the exhumation of the presumed grave of the absurdist painter, playwright and novelist Stanisław Ignacy Witkiewicz (suicide 1939) in Zakopane. Genetic tests on the remains show they belonged to an unknown woman.
December 1 – Iceland's National and University Library of Iceland (Landsbókasafn Íslands – Háskólabókasafn) is founded in Reykjavík by merging the former national library, Landsbókasafn Íslands, established in 1818, with the university library of 1940.
unknown dates
Penguin Books offer Peter James's novel Host on two floppy disks as "the world's first electronic novel".
The first Giller Prize for Canadian Fiction is awarded.

New books

Fiction
Peter Ackroyd – Dan Leno and the Limehouse Golem
Nelson Algren (died 1981) – The Texas Stories of Nelson Algren (short stories)
Kevin J. Anderson
Champions of the Force
Dark Apprentice
Jedi Search
Reed Arvin – The Wind in the Wheat
Thomas Berger – Robert Crews
Louis de Bernières – Captain Corelli's Mandolin
Xurxo Borrazás – Vicious
Lily Brett – Just Like That
George Mackay Brown – Beside the Ocean of Time
Christopher Bulis – State of Change
James Chapman – Glass (Pray the Electrons Back to Sand)
Tom Clancy – Debt of Honor
Jonathan Coe – What a Carve Up!
Michael Connelly – The Concrete Blonde
Paul Cornell
Goth Opera
No Future
Bernard Cornwell – Copperhead
Douglas Coupland – Life After God
Michael Crichton – Disclosure
Terrance Dicks – Blood Harvest
Stephen R. Donaldson – The Gap into Madness: Chaos and Order
Bret Easton Ellis – The Informers
Valerio Evangelisti – Nicolas Eymerich, inquisitore
David Frum – Dead Right
Stephen Fry – The Hippopotamus
William Gaddis – A Frolic of His Own
Neil Gaiman 
The Sandman: Brief Lives (graphic novel, seventh in The Sandman series)
The Sandman: Worlds' End (graphic novel, eighth in The Sandman series)
Neil Gaiman & Dave McKean – Mr. Punch (graphic novel)
John Gardner – SeaFire
James Finn Garner – Politically Correct Bedtime Stories
David S. Garnett – Stargonauts
Mark Gatiss – St Anthony's Fire
Judith Godrèche – Point de côté
John Grisham – The Chamber
Romesh Gunesekera – Reef
Abdulrazak Gurnah – Paradise
Peter Handke – My Year in the No-Man's-Bay
Epeli Hau'ofa – Tales of the Tikongs
Dermot Healy – A Goat's Song
Joseph Heller – Closing Time
James Herbert – The Ghosts of Sleath
Craig Hinton – The Crystal Bucephalus
Alan Hollinghurst – The Folding Star
Nancy Huston – La Virevolte
John Irving – A Son of the Circus
Alexander Jablokov – The Breath of Suspension
James Kelman – How late it was, how late
Stephen King – Insomnia
Dean R. Koontz – Dark Rivers of the Heart
Joe R. Lansdale – Mucho Mojo
Andy Lane – All-Consuming Fire
Ursula K. Le Guin – "The Matter of Seggri" (in Crank!)
Madeleine L'Engle – Troubling a Star
Paul Leonard – Venusian Lullaby
Jonathan Lethem – Gun, with Occasional Music
H. P. Lovecraft – Miscellaneous Writings
Steve Lyons – Conundrum
F. Gwynplaine MacIntyre – The Woman Between the Worlds
David A. McIntee – First Frontier
Javier Marías – Tomorrow in the Battle Think on Me (Mañana en la batalla piensa en mí)
Simon Messingham – Strange England
James A. Michener – Recessional
Rick Moody – The Ice Storm
Jim Mortimore – Parasite
Ryū Murakami (村上 龍) – Piercing (ピアッシング, English translation 2007)
Tim O'Brien – In the Lake of the Woods
Daniel O'Mahony – Falls the Shadow
V. S. Naipaul – A Way in the World
John Peel – Evolution
Ellis Peters – Brother Cadfael's Penance
Terry Pratchett
Interesting Times
Soul Music
Qiu Miaojin (邱妙津) – Notes of a Crocodile
James Redfield – The Celestine Prophecy
Matthew Reilly – Contest
Justin Richards – Theatre of War
Gareth Roberts – Tragedy Day
Gary Russell – Legacy
Sidney Sheldon – Nothing Lasts Forever
Carol Shields – The Stone Diaries
Michael Slade – Ripper
S. P. Somtow – Jasmine Nights
Danielle Steel
Accident
The Gift
Wings
Botho Strauß – Living Glimmering Lying
Antonio Tabucchi – Pereira Maintains (Sostiene Pereira)
William Trevor – Felicia's Journey
John Updike – Brazil
Andrew Vachss – Down in the Zero
Marlene van Niekerk – Triomf
Binod Bihari Verma – Balanak Bonihar O Pallavi
Jill Paton Walsh – Knowledge of Angels
Tim Winton – The Riders

Children and young people
Pamela Allen – Clippity-Clop
Chris Van Allsburg – The Mysteries of Harris Burdick
Nancy Farmer – The Ear, the Eye and the Arm
Mem Fox – Tough Boris
Gayle Greeno – Mind-Speakers' Call
Donald Hall (with Barry Moser)
The Farm Summer 1942
I Am the Dog, I Am the Cat
Julius Lester –John Henry
J. Patrick Lewis (with Gary Kelley) – The Christmas of the Reddle Moon
Sam McBratney – Guess How Much I Love You (board book)
Andre Norton (with Martin H. Greenberg and Braldt Bralds) – Catfantastic III
Glyn Parry –Monster Man
Gloria Jean Pinkney –The Sunday Outing
Jennifer Rowe (as Mary-Anne Dickinson) – The Charm Bracelet (first in the Fairy Realm series of ten books)
Francesca Simon – Horrid Henry (first in the eponymous series of 24 books)
Amy Tan – Sagwa, the Chinese Siamese Cat
Jacqueline Wilson – Freddy's Teddy (first in the eponymous series of four books)

Drama
Marina Carr – The Mai
Kevin Elyot – My Night With Reg
Terry Johnson – Dead Funny
Arthur Miller – Broken Glass
Yasmina Reza – Art

Poetry

Sophie Cabot Black – The Misunderstanding of Nature

Non-fiction
Michael Asher – Thesiger
Alan Bennett – Writing Home
John Berendt – Midnight in the Garden of Good and Evil
Denise Chong – The Concubine's Children
Antonio Damasio – Descartes' Error: Emotion, Reason, and the Human Brain
Anne Hugon – Vers Tombouctou : L'Afrique des explorateurs II
Paul Lawrence Farber – Finding Order in Nature: The Naturalist Tradition from Linnaeus to E. O. Wilson
Leon Forrest – Relocations of the Spirit: Collected Essays
V. A. C. Gatrell – The Hanging Tree: Execution and the English People 1780–1868
Martin Gilbert – In Search of Churchill
Christina Hoff Sommers – Who Stole Feminism? How Women Have Betrayed Women
Will Hutton – The State We're In
Richard Leakey – The Origin of Humankind
Li Zhisui (邱妙津) – The Private Life of Chairman Mao
Steven Pinker – The Language Instinct
Tricia Rose – Black Noise: Rap Music and Black Culture in Contemporary America
Carl Sagan – Pale Blue Dot: A Vision of the Human Future in Space
Richard B. Trask – Pictures of the Pain: Photography and the Assassination of President Kennedy
Gabrielle van Zuylen – The Garden: Visions of Paradise
Charles P. Cozic – Nationalism and Ethnic Conflict
Elizabeth Wurtzel – Prozac Nation

Births
April 18 – Alexandra Adornetto, Australian children's novelist
October 16 - Alice Oseman, English author of young adult fiction

Deaths
January 3 – Frank Belknap Long, American horror, fantasy and sci-fi writer (born 1901)
January 30 – Pierre Boulle, French novelist (born 1912)
January 31 – Erwin Strittmatter, German writer (born 1912)
February 6 – Jack Kirby, American comic book cartoonist (born 1917)
February 11 – Paul Feyerabend, Austrian philosopher of science (born 1924)
February 26 – J. L. Carr, English novelist (born 1912)
February 27 – Harold Acton, English writer, scholar and dilettante (born 1904)
March 9 – Charles Bukowski, German-born American poet and novelist (born 1920)
March 20 – Lewis Grizzard, American journalist and author (born 1946)
March 28 – Eugène Ionesco, Romanian playwright (born 1909)
April 16 – Ralph Ellison, American scholar and writer (born 1914)
May 24 – John Wain, English novelist, poet and critic (born 1925)
May 30
Juan Carlos Onetti, Uruguayan writer (born 1909)
Isobel English (June Guesdon Jolliffe), English novelist (born 1920)
June 7 – Dennis Potter, English TV dramatist (born 1935)
June 17 – Yuri Nagibin, Soviet screenwriter and novelist (born 1920)
June 26 – Jahanara Imam, Bangladeshi writer and political activist (born 1929)
July 5 – Vaikom Muhammad Basheer, Malayalam short story writer (born 1908)
July 30 – Robin Cook (Derek Raymond), English novelist (born 1931)
August 7 – Rosa Chacel, Spanish writer (born 1898)
August 14 – Alice Childress, African American playwright, actress and young-adult novelist (born 1916)
August 25 – Bidhyanath Pokhrel, Nepali poet (born 1918)
September 7 – James Clavell, Australian-born American novelist (born 1921)
November 12 – J. I. M. Stewart (Michael Innes), Scottish novelist and critic (born 1906)
November 15 – Elizabeth George Speare, American children's writer (born 1908)
November 28 – Ian Serraillier, English novelist and poet (born 1912)
December 12 – Donna J. Stone, American poet and philanthropist (born 1933)
December 20 – Eva Alexanderson, Swedish novelist and translator (born 1911)
December 24 – John Osborne, English dramatist (born 1929)

Awards
Nobel Prize for Literature: Kenzaburō Ōe
Europe Theatre Prize: Heiner Müller
Camões Prize: Jorge Amado

Australia
The Australian/Vogel Literary Award: Darren Williams, Swimming In Silk
C. J. Dennis Prize for Poetry: Robert Gray, Certain Things
Kenneth Slessor Prize for Poetry: Barry Hill, Ghosting William Buckley
Mary Gilmore Prize: Deborah Staines, Now, Millennium
Miles Franklin Award: Rodney Hall, The Grisly Wife

Canada
Bronwen Wallace Memorial Award
Edna Staebler Award: Linda Johns, Sharing a Robin's Life,
Giller Prize for Canadian Fiction: M.G. Vassanji, The Book of Secrets
See 1994 Governor General's Awards for a complete list of winners and finalists for those awards.

France
Prix Goncourt: Didier Van Cauwelaert, Un Aller simple
Prix Décembre: Jean Hatzfeld, L'Air de guerre and Éric Holder, La Belle Jardinière
Prix Médicis French: Yves Berger, Immobile dans le courant du fleuve
Prix Médicis International: Robert Schneider, Frère Sommeil

United Kingdom
Booker Prize: James Kelman, How Late It Was, How Late
Carnegie Medal for children's literature: Theresa Breslin, Whispers in the Graveyard
James Tait Black Memorial Prize for fiction: Alan Hollinghurst, The Folding Star
James Tait Black Memorial Prize for biography: Doris Lessing, Under My Skin
Cholmondeley Award: Ruth Fainlight, Gwen Harwood, Elizabeth Jennings, John Mole
Eric Gregory Award: Julia Copus, Alice Oswald, Steven Blyth, Kate Clanchy, Giles Goodland
Whitbread Best Book Award: William Trevor, Felicia's Journey

United States
Agnes Lynch Starrett Poetry Prize: Jan Beatty, Mad River
Aiken Taylor Award for Modern American Poetry: Wendell Berry
Anisfield-Wolf Book Award: Judith Ortiz Cofer, The Latin Deli: Prose and Poetry
Bernard F. Connors Prize for Poetry: Stewart James, "Vanessa", and (separately) Marilyn Hacker, "Cancer Winter"
Bobbitt National Prize for Poetry: A. R. Ammons, Garbage
Compton Crook Award: Mary Rosenblum, The Drylands
National Book Award for Fiction: William Gaddis, A Frolic of His Own
National Book Critics Circle Award: Carol Shields, The Stone Diaries
Nebula Award: Greg Bear, Moving Mars
Newbery Medal for children's literature: Lois Lowry, The Giver
PEN/Faulkner Award for Fiction: Philip Roth, Operation Shylock
Pulitzer Prize for Drama: Edward Albee, Three Tall Women
Pulitzer Prize for Fiction: E. Annie Proulx, The Shipping News
Pulitzer Prize for Poetry: Yusef Komunyakaa, Neon Vernacular: New and Selected Poems
Wallace Stevens Award inaugurated with first award this year: W. S. Merwin
Whiting Awards:
Fiction: Louis Edward, Mary Hood, Randall Kenan (fiction/nonfiction), Kate Wheeler
Nonfiction: Kennedy Fraser, Wayne Koestenbaum (nonfiction/poetry), Rosemary Mahoney, Claudia Roth Pierpont
Poetry: Mark Doty, Mary Swander (poetry/nonfiction)

Elsewhere
Montana Book Award for Poetry: Bill Manhire, ed., 100 New Zealand Poems
New Zealand Book Award for Poetry: Andrew Johnston, How to Talk
Premio Nadal: Rosa Regàs, Azul
Premio de la Crítica de narrativa gallega: Xurxo Borrazás, Vicious

References

 
Literature
Years of the 20th century in literature